Boubacar Bernard Kamara (born 23 November 1999) is a French professional footballer who plays as a defensive midfielder for Premier League club Aston Villa and the France national team.

Mainly a defensive midfielder, he can also play as a centre-back.

Club career

Marseille 
In September 2005, "Bouba", aged 5, entered the Olympique de Marseille Academy where he progressed through all the categories. He eventually became the captain of the U19 team that made its way to the final of the Coupe Gambardella. At the age of 16, he was promoted to Marseille's reserve team, also making his debut with the senior team. As coach of the reserves, Jacques Abardonado made him a regular starter.

Kamara made his debut as a professional side on 13 December 2016 against Sochaux in a Coupe de la Ligue match. He started the match and was replaced by Hiroki Sakai in the 82nd minute of a 1–1 (4–3) away loss on penalties. He scored his first professional goal on 5 February 2019, a header in a 1–0 home Ligue 1 victory over Bordeaux.

Kamara went onto play 170 times for his boyhood club, under several different managers - being utilised mainly as a defensive midfielder, but also featuring as a right-back, left-back, central midfielder and right-sided midfielder.

Aston Villa 
On 23 May 2022, it was announced that Kamara had signed a five-year contract with English Premier League club Aston Villa ahead of the expiry of his Marseille contract on 1 July. He made his Aston Villa debut on 6 August 2022, in a 2–0 defeat to AFC Bournemouth. On 16 September 2022, during a 1–0 victory over Southampton, Kamara jarred his knee in a tackle with Mohamed Elyounoussi - the subsequent ligament strain ruled Kamara out until November, meaning that he missed the 2022 FIFA World Cup. Kamara returned to the pitch slightly ahead of schedule on 6 November 2022, in a 3–1 victory over Manchester United.

International career 
Kamara was eligible to play for the national teams of France through birth, and Senegal through his family heritage. He played youth football for France at U17, U18, U19, U20 and U21 levels. Featuring in the 2019 FIFA U-20 World Cup and the 2021 UEFA European Under-21 Championship for France. 

In 2022, Kamara was contacted directly by Senegal manager Aliou Cissé to convince him to declare for the Senegalese team after their 2021 Africa Cup of Nations victory to fill the space of aging midfielders Idrissa Gueye and Cheikhou Kouyaté. 

However, despite Cissé stating that there was an "agreement in principle" between the parties, on 19 May 2022, Kamara was selected in the France first team for the first time. Kamara made his debut on 6 June 2022, as a second half substitute in a 1–1 away UEFA Nations League draw against Croatia, thus committing his international future to France.

Personal life
Kamara was born in France to a Senegalese father and a French mother. Kamara has been a supporter of OM since he was a child after going to the Stade Vélodrome with his mother Cathy. He has a son, Leeroy, with Coralie Porrovecchio.

Career statistics

Club

International

Honours
Marseille
UEFA Europa League runner-up: 2017–18

References

External links

 Profile at the Aston Villa F.C. website

1999 births
Living people
Footballers from Marseille
French footballers
French sportspeople of Senegalese descent
France youth international footballers
France under-21 international footballers
Association football midfielders
Olympique de Marseille players
Aston Villa F.C. players
Ligue 1 players
Championnat National 2 players
Premier League players
Black French sportspeople
French sportspeople of Mauritanian descent
France international footballers
French expatriate footballers
French expatriate sportspeople in England
Expatriate footballers in England